The broadspotted molly (Poecilia latipunctata), locally known as molly del Tamesi, is a critically endangered species of fish in the family Poeciliidae, endemic to a small part of the Tamesí River system (itself part of the Pánuco River basin) in Mexico.

References

External links
 

Poecilia
Taxa named by Seth Eugene Meek
Fish described in 1904
Endemic fish of Mexico
Freshwater fish of Mexico
Taxonomy articles created by Polbot